The 1896–97 WPHL season was the first season of championship hockey of Pittsburgh's Western Pennsylvania Hockey League. The season opened on November 17, 1896, and was well underway when brought to an end by the destruction of fire of the league's facility, the Schenley Park Casino ice rink on December 17, 1896.

League business
The Casino had installed an artificial ice-making plant in 1895 and the 1895-96 winter season saw the first introduction of hockey at the rink. Challenge exhibition matches of ice polo between the Canadian Queen's University of Kingston, Ontario, and Western University of Pennsylvania were held at the rink, and Queen's demonstrated the game of ice hockey. Between then and November 1896, the Casino management decided to organize two leagues at the rink; an inter-scholastic league for high schools, and a senior league. Both leagues were amateur. The senior league was named the Western Pennsylvania League.

The first league members were Pittsburgh Athletic Club, Duquesne Country and Athletic Club, Western University and a team to represent the Casino, or the "Pittsburgh" team. The league played twice a week, on Tuesday and Friday nights.

Rules
The rules of the league were published in the Pittsburg Press on December 20, 1896:

Source:

Season
Play continued until December 16, when the Casino rink was destroyed by fire. The Pittsburghs, PAC and Western University teams, and all of the inter-scholastic teams lost their hockey equipment in the fire. The Pittsburghs loss was estimated at $300.

Results

Final standings

Regular season results

Play was suspended after fire destroyed the Casino rink. No championship was declared.

References

Western Pennsylvania Hockey League seasons
WPHL